This Is...Augustus Pablo is a studio album by Augustus Pablo originally released in 1974 and co-written and produced by Pablo's childhood friend and critically acclaimed reggae producer Clive Chin. The album boasts an impressive list of session musicians including Ansel Collins on keyboards and Lloyd Parks and Aston Barrett both on bass guitar. The album was one of the first to showcase Pablo's unique use of the melodica.

Track listing
 "Dub Organizer" (Chin, Swaby) – 2:56
 "Please Sunrise" (Adapted) – 2:38
 "Point Blank" (Chin, Swaby) – 2:32
 "Arabian Rock" (Chin, Swaby) – 3:53
 "Pretty Baby" (Adapted) – 2:45
 "Pablo in Dub " (Swaby) – 2:30
 "Skateland Rock" (Chin, Swaby) – 3:13
 "Dread Eye" (Adapted) – 3:03
 "Too Late" (Chin, Swaby) – 3:16
 "Assignment No. 1" (Chin, Swaby) – 2:46
 "Jah Rock" (Chin, Swaby) – 2:52
 "Lover's Mood" (Chin, Swaby) – 2:55

Personnel
 Augustus Pablo – keyboards, melodica
 Lloyd "Tinleg" Adams – drums
 Aston Barrett – bass guitar, guitar
 Carlton "Charlie" Barrett – drums
 Clive Chin – percussion
 Ansel Collins – keyboards
 Carlton "Santa" Davis – drums
 George Fullwood – bass guitar
 Bertram "Ranchie" McLean – guitar
 Lloyd Parks – bass guitar
 Earl "Chinna" Smith – guitar
 Errol Thompson – percussion

References

External links
Roots Archives

Augustus Pablo albums
1974 debut albums